One of the indicators of the strength of a brand in the hearts and minds of customers, brand preference represents which brands are preferred under assumptions of equality in price and availability.

Purpose 

Measures of brand preference attempt to quantify the impact of marketing activities in the hearts and minds of customers and potential customers. Higher brand preference usually indicates more revenues (sales) and profit, also making it an indicator of company financial performance.

Construction 
There are at least three classes of methodologies to measure brand preference directly: 
 Survey questions (self-report, unaided preference)
 Brand choice measures (choice of preferred brand from a competitive set of brands)
 Constant sum measures (planned purchases amongst a competitive set of brands)

Methodologies 
 ARS Persuasion   is a brand choice methodology applied at various stages of the marketing process. It is derived by comparing the percent choosing a particular brand versus competing brands   before and after marketing activity .  
 Firstep applies the methodology to a selling proposition before moving on to creative execution. 
 APM Facts are the results of the methodology applied to TV ads. It has been audited and profiled by the Marketing Accountability Standards Board (MASB) according to MMAP (Marketing Metric Audit Protocol) . A MMAP audit examines the 10 characteristics of an "ideal metric," including reliability, calibration, predictive validity, etc.
 Brand Preference Monitor (BPM) tracks the impact of all marketing activity over time.

References

External links 
 MASB Official Website

Brand management
Brands
Branding terminology
Communication design
Graphic design
Product management